Elbrus Petrovich Tandelov (born 1 December 1982) is a former Russian professional footballer.

Club career
He made his professional debut in the Russian Second Division in 2001 for FC Mozdok.

He played 5 seasons in the Russian Football National League for FC Alania Vladikavkaz and FC Mordovia Saransk.

Honours
 Russian Second Division Zone South best striker: 2005.

References

1982 births
People from Prigorodny District, North Ossetia–Alania
Living people
Russian footballers
Association football forwards
FC Spartak Vladikavkaz players
FC Mordovia Saransk players
FC Taganrog players
Sportspeople from North Ossetia–Alania